The men's 5000 metres at the 2015 World Championships in Athletics was held at the Beijing National Stadium on 26 and 29 August.

Summary
It was difficult to predict the results.  Down at number 21 was the double Olympic Champion, defending champion attempting to repeat his double from two years earlier, Mo Farah, undoubtedly the favorite.  At number 3 was returning silver medalist Hagos Gebrhiwet coming from the fastest race of the year in Rome, won by his Ethiopian teammate, World Junior Champion Yomif Kejelcha.  Returning bronze medalist Isiah Koech was down at number 13.  2014 Diamond League Champion and Commonwealth Games Champion Caleb Mwangangi Ndiku was nowhere to be seen in the top 50 in the world, not having to qualify in the Kenyan trials.

In the finals, it was a slow pace at the beginning.  Absurdly, the organizers placed a water station in lane 9, instead of lane 3 where it was located during the 10,000.  At 1200 metres, with the pace dawdling, Farah alone chose to take advantage of the water stop, having to run all the way across the track in both directions, but still maintaining contact with the back of the field.  At the front of the pack, by default, was a British uniform, but not Farah, it was Tom Farrell with eyes wandering to the TV monitors.  You could sense the entire field was wanting to use a rear view mirror.  What is Farah doing back there?

After five and a half laps, Farah casually jogged to the outside past the entire field to behind Farrell.  Suddenly the scramble was on, people rushing for position.  Imane Merga rushed to the front and took a 2-meter lead.  Farah marked that and let Merga lead until four and a half laps to go still at an agonizingly slow pace, then Farah decided to take the lead and move just slightly faster.  All of the other favorites jockeyed around but none of them seemed to make an attempt to pass him.

Having watched Farah launch his kick from 500 meters out in the 10,000 metres earlier in this meet, Ndiku tried to go one better and started to run for home with more than 800 to go, Farah running to stay in contact, Gebrhiwet, Galen Rupp, Ben True and Kejelcha in tow.  For the next lap the field stretched out.  Farah made a brief burst tor try to take the lead just before one lap to go, but Ndiku wouldn't let him by.  One by one all the other suitors fell off the back, the last Gebrhiwet, finally fading on the backstretch, but Farah crept closer.  Around the final turn, Kejelcha passed Gebrhiwet, while Farah moved into position to launch a final kick.	
With a perfectly executed final sprint, Farah passed Ndiku with 70 metres to go, Ndiku had nothing in the tank to respond with.	
Behind them Gebrhiwet executed a similar pass against his teammate Kejelcha to take the bronze.

Ndiku ran the next to the last lap in 56.3 (Farah slightly slower), Farah completed the last 800 metres in 1:49.0  Despite the assortment of national affiliations listed, the entire pack, the top 13 finishers came from just four countries, three of them neighboring countries of East Africa; Somalia 1-12, Kenya 2-8-9-10-11, Ethiopia 3-4-13 and USA 5-6-7.

Records
Prior to the competition, the records were as follows:

Qualification standards

Schedule

Results

Heats
Qualification: First 5 in each heat (Q) and the next 5 fastest (q) advanced to the final.

Final
The final was started at 19:30

References

5000
5000 metres at the World Athletics Championships